Barleycorn may refer to:

 A grain of barley
 Barleycorn (unit) a unit of length, equal to one-third of an inch
 Barleycorn (surname)
 The Barleycorn, an Irish traditional music band
 "John Barleycorn", a traditional British folk-song
 John Barleycorn (novel), by Jack London